Drenovo is a village in the municipality of Kavadarci, North Macedonia.

Demographics
On the 1927 ethnic map of Leonhard Schulze-Jena, the village is shown as a Muslim Bulgarian village. According to the 2002 census, the village had a total of 648 inhabitants. Ethnic groups in the village include:

Macedonians 648

References

Villages in Kavadarci Municipality